"Denomination Blues" is a gospel blues song composed by Washington Phillips (18801954), and recorded by him (vocals and zither) in 1927.

In 1938, Sister Rosetta Tharpe (191573) recorded a gospel version of the song under the title "That's All". She subsequently recorded several versions with orchestral accompaniment.

In 1972, Ry Cooder recorded the song on his album Into the Purple Valley.

The songs

Denomination Blues 
Phillips' song is in two parts, occupying both sides of a 78rpm single (it is over five minutes long, and could not have fitted on a single side because of technical limitations).  In 1928, it sold just over 8,000 copies; a considerable number at a time when a typical single by Bessie Smith, "The Empress of the Blues", sold around 10,000.

The song is in strophic form: it consists of 17 verses sung to essentially the same music, all with a similar last line. In Part 1, Phillips gently mocks several Christian denominations for their particular obsessions (Primitive Baptists, Missionary Baptists, A.M.E. Methodists, African Methodists, Holiness People, and Church of God); and in Part 2, several types of people he felt were insincere in their beliefs (preachers who want your money, preachers who insist that a college education is needed to preach the gospel, and people who "jump from church to church"). Phillips is known to have attended several churches of different denominations, and the lyrics likely reflect his personal experience. His own faith was uncomplicated, as these extracts from the lyrics show:

The song appears to have been thereafter completely neglected until 1972, when Ry Cooder included a version (with verses omitted and rearranged) on his album Into the Purple Valley. It has since been covered several times. Many cover versions omit some of, or rearrange, or add to, or rewrite, Phillips' words; perhaps for artistic reasons, or perhaps to support the artist's own beliefs; sometimes contradicting the message Phillips had tried to convey. Some cover artists, negligently or otherwise, have claimed the song to be their own composition.

That's All 

In 1938, Sister Rosetta Tharpe recorded a version of the song entitled "That's All" for Decca Records. She recorded four songs that day, the first gospel songs recorded by Decca; all were immediate successes. The tune is similar to but not identical to Phillips'; the lyrics include some of Phillips' words (notably the striking phrase "educated fool", and the words "that's all" repeated at the end of each verse), but differ in several ways. That, and her choice of title, suggests that she may have learned the song through oral tradition rather than from Phillips' recording. In 1941, she re-recorded the song, accompanied by Lucky Millinder's Jazz  She continued to perform it throughout her career.

Although Tharpe's "That's All" had gained an independent life, the recording history suggests that it and Phillips' "Denomination Blues" have merged back into a single stream following Cooder's 1972 cover of the latter song; for example, The 77s' 1982 version uses both titles.

Recordings

Denomination Blues 

 1927Washington Phillips, Columbia single 
 1969-74Perry Tillis 
 1972Ry Cooder, on the album Into the Purple Valley
 1975Barry McGuire, 2nd Chapter of Acts and a band called David, on the album To the Bride 
 1975Parchment, on the album Shamblejam
 1982The 77s, "Denomination Blues (That's All)"  on the album Ping Pong over the Abyss
 1992Marianne Antonsen, on the album Pickin' Up the Spirit 
 1996Michael Hakanson-Stacy, "Denomination Blues, Pt. 2"  on the album Sanctuary Blues 
 1999Geoff Bartley, on the album Hear That Wind Howl 
 2000The 77s, on the album Late
 2005Taylor Grocery Band, on the album Taylor Grocery Band 
 2006Rodney Crowell, on the album Voice of the Spirit, Gospel of the South 
 2008Buddy Greene, on the DVD A Campfire Homecoming 
 2009Ashley Cleveland, on the album God Don't Never Change 
 2010Blue Rhythm Boys, on the album Come On If You're Comin''' 
 2011Kenny Brown, on the album Can't Stay Long 

 That's All 

 1938Sister Rosetta Tharpe, Decca single 
 1941Sister Rosetta Tharpe with Lucky Millinder's Jazz Orchestra, Decca single 
 1943Sister Rosetta Tharpe with Lucky Millinder's Jazz Orchestra (live) 
 1943Sister Rosetta Tharpe with (probably) Noble Sissle and His Orchestra (live) 
 1961Sister Rosetta Tharpe 
 2013Brick Fields and The Chosen Ones (feat. Rj Mischo), on the MP3 album Go Ahead and Sang the Blues''

References 

Gospel songs
Washington Phillips songs
1927 songs
Columbia Records singles
Decca Records singles
Ry Cooder songs